Sean Brendan Collins (born December 29, 1988) is a Canadian professional ice hockey forward. He is currently playing with Adler Mannheim of the Deutsche Eishockey Liga (DEL). He was drafted 187th overall by the Columbus Blue Jackets in the 2008 NHL Entry Draft.

Playing career
Collins played minor junior hockey with the Waywayseecappo Wolverines in the Manitoba Junior Hockey League from 2006 to 2008 before he was picked by the Columbus Blue Jackets in the seventh round of the 2008 NHL Entry Draft. He was signed to an entry-level contract with the Blue Jackets organization following the end of his last season of ECAC Hockey with the Cornell Big Red. He was assigned to Columbus' American Hockey League affiliate, the Springfield Falcons, where he played eight games and registered five points.

At the start of the 2012–13 season, with the NHL lock-out in effect, he was directly assigned to the Falcons. Midway through the season with the Falcons, Collins was recalled by Columbus and made his NHL debut in a 3-2 defeat to the Anaheim Ducks on February 18, 2013.

On July 1, 2015, Collins left the Blue Jackets organization as a free agent and signed a one-year, two-way contract with the Washington Capitals.

On July 24, 2016, Collins opted to continue his career in the Kontinental Hockey League, signing a one-year deal with Chinese entrant, HC Kunlun Red Star. In the 2016–17 season, Collins enjoyed a successful introduction to the KHL with Kunlun, scoring the team's first regular season goal and contributing offensively with 39 points in 60 games to help reach the post-season in their inaugural season.

On May 5, 2017, Collins moved as a free agent to fellow KHL outfit, HC Sochi, on a one-year deal.

After spending the past three seasons with Sochi, Collins opted to return to Kunlun, signing a one-year contract with the team on December 4, 2020.

Career statistics

References

External links
 

1988 births
Living people
Adler Mannheim players
Canadian ice hockey centres
Columbus Blue Jackets draft picks
Columbus Blue Jackets players
Cornell Big Red men's ice hockey players
Hershey Bears players
HC Kunlun Red Star players
Ice hockey people from Saskatchewan
Sportspeople from Saskatoon
HC Sochi players
Springfield Falcons players
Washington Capitals players
Waywayseecappo Wolverines players